Sheikh Eid Bin Mohammad Al Thani Charitable Association is a Qatari charitable organizations established in 1995 in Doha, Qatar. The organization was named after Sheikh Eid Ibn Mohammad ibn Thani ibn Jasim ibn Mohammad Al Thani (1922-1994). The U.S. Department of Treasury has characterized the organization's founder as "terrorist financier and facilitator who has provided money and material support and conveyed communications to al-Qa'ida and its affiliates in Syria, Iraq, Somalia and Yemen for more than a decade. ”  
The Eid Charity Foundation has been described as a Government Organized Non-Governmental Organization (GONGO) with close ties to government institutions.

Relief and Humanitarian Efforts 
Eid Charity provides a wide range of services to people in need in Qatar and elsewhere in the Middle East from food collection and distribution to the poor to supporting drug awareness and rehabilitation programs. It has also supported relief efforts in Syria, Iraq, Yemen, the Palestinian territories, and other countries.

In August 2016, Eid Charity announced that the organization has obtained contracts to build 335 mosques in 17 countries around the world. According to reports, some of the 335 mosques have been built while others will be built throughout 2016. The construction of the mosques will cost about QR 21 million.

Nawaf Alhamadi is the Director General of Sheikh Eid bin Mohammad Al Thani Charitable Association. Ali bin Khaled al Hajri is the Executive Director of Foreign Projects at Eid Charity. Hashim bin Mohammad al-Awadhy is the adviser to the Director General of Eid Charity. Al-Awadhy is a Qatari businessman and the owner of Rabea TV, a TV network broadcast from Istanbul in support of the Egyptian Muslim Brotherhood. Hashim al-Awadhy’s son, Mohammed bin Hashim al-Awadhy, led an Islamic charitable organization and was reportedly killed while fighting with ISIS.

Terrorism Controversy 
Abd Al-Rahman al-Nuaimi, is a founder of the Sheikh Eid bin Mohammad Al Thani Charitable Association in addition to previously serving as a President of the Qatar Football Association, and a history professor at Qatar University, In 2013, the U.S. Department of Treasury added al-Nuaimi to its list of Specially Designated Global Terrorists (SDGT) and described al-Nuaimi as “a Qatar-based terrorist financier and facilitator who has provided money and material support and conveyed communications to al-Qa'ida and its affiliates in Syria, Iraq, Somalia and Yemen for more than a decade.” The announcement also claimed that al-Nuaimi had provided financial support to a charity headed by Al-Qaeda financier and SDGT Abd al-Wahhab Muhammad Abd al-Rahman al-Humayqani. Similar designations from the UN Security Council, EU, UK, and Turkey followed. Al-Nuaimi is also the Secretary General of the Global Anti-Aggression Campaign, an NGO that has repeatedly hosted Hamas leaders, and a founding member and former president of Alkarama, a Geneva-based human rights NGO that works with the UN to advocate for civil rights in the Arab World. In 2013, the Washington Post claimed that Alkarama “lobbies on behalf of Islamist detainees around the world”, including Islamist militias active in Syria, and accuses Western and Arab governments of undermining groups that promote Islamic rule. Humayqani is also an Alkarama founding member.

The association has been accused by Israel of funneling funds to Hamas through its charitable endeavors in the Gaza Strip. Most notably, Israel banned the association and 35 other member organizations of the “Union of Good,” which the Israeli government considers “a roof organization for foundations operated by Hamas around the world, especially in Europe and the Persian Gulf countries.” The Chairman of the Union of Good is Sheikh Yusuf al-Qaradawi, a Qatari-based cleric who is the “spiritual leader of the Muslim Brotherhood.”

In 2013, one of the founders of the association, Abd Al-Rahman al-Nouami, was named a Specially Designated Global Terrorist by the United States Government for his alleged role in facilitating financing and communications for Al-Qaeda affiliates in Iraq, Syria, Yemen, and Somalia. He was similarly sanctioned by the United Nations, European Union, United Kingdom, and Turkey in 2014, resulting in a freeze of his assets.

While he has denied the allegations, subsequent media reports noted his connection to the government-backed charity and other humanitarian organizations.

References 

Charities based in Qatar
Organizations established in 1995
1995 establishments in Qatar
Organizations designated as terrorist by Bahrain